The T2 Medium Tank was an American design that replaced three prototype medium tank designs started in the 1920s for an experiment conducted by the United States Army. The T2 tank never saw combat nor left prototype stages and due to lack of funds was not mass-produced with only one built in 1930 by Rock Island Arsenal. Its legacy, however, was the M2 light tank, developed into the M2 medium, and onto the M3 Lee and M4 Sherman medium tanks.

Design 
Following the testing of the Medium Tank M1921 two new medium tank projects were approved in 1926, one of which was for a lighter 15 ton tank design. The first design, armed with a gun in the hull front and a smaller gun in the turret, did not progress due to lack of funding and instead the Light Tank T1E1 was used as a basis.

The design of the T2 was largely inspired by the British Vickers Medium Mark II and was later developed into the M2 light tank. When the T2 Medium Tank was built, its weight had to be reduced drastically because the US War Department had set a maximum weight of 15 tons. The T2 weighed only 14 tons when it was combat-loaded. The secondary armament was a 0.5 inch (12.7mm) machine gun and a 0.3 inch (7.62mm) machine gun at the front of the hull on the right; these were later replaced with a single 30 cal machine gun. The primary armament was a 47mm semi-automatic gun mounted on the turret and it initially had an additional 37mm cannon placed on the hull but that was abandoned in 1931. Only one T2 was produced; it is currently on display at Fort Lee, Virginia.

References 

Rickard, J (13 May 2016), Medium Tank T2

Interwar tanks of the United States
Medium tanks of the United States
Abandoned military projects of the United States
Trial and research tanks of the United States